The omer ( ‘ōmer) is an ancient Israelite unit of dry measure used in the era of the Temple in Jerusalem and also known as an isaron. It is used in the Bible as an ancient unit of volume for grains and dry commodities, and the Torah mentions it as being equal to one tenth of an ephah.

In traditional Jewish standards of measurement, the omer was equivalent to the volume of 43.2 chicken's eggs, or what is also known as one-tenth of an ephah (three seahs).

The word omer is sometimes translated as "sheaf" — specifically, an amount of grain large enough to require bundling. The biblical episode of the manna describes God as instructing the Israelites to collect an omer for each person in your tent, implying that each person could eat an omer of manna a day. In the Torah, the main significance of the omer is the traditional offering (during the Temple period) of an omer of barley on the day after the Sabbath, or, according to the rabbinical view, on the second day of Passover during the feast of unleavened bread, as well as the tradition of the Counting of the Omer (sefirat ha'omer) -  the 49 days between this sacrifice and the two loaves of wheat offered on the holiday of Shavuot. During the Temple period, the offering of the omer was one of twenty-four priestly gifts, and one of the ten which were offered to priests within the Temple precincts, when Jewish farmers would bring the first of that year's grain crop to Jerusalem.  

Jews in Lancaster, Pennsylvania used an omer board from about 1800 to keep track of harvest days between Passover and Shavuot.  An example of such a board survives at the Herbert D. Katz Center for Advanced Judaic Studies at the University of Pennsylvania.

See also
Biblical and Talmudic units of measurement
Omer (disambiguation)

References

Obsolete units of measurement
Jewish sacrificial law
Units of volume
Passover
Hebrew words and phrases in the Hebrew Bible